Brasserie Les Halles was a French-brasserie-style restaurant located on 15 John Street (between Broadway & Nassau Street; in the Financial District) in Manhattan, New York City. Previous locations were on Park Avenue South in Manhattan, in Tokyo, Miami, and Washington, D.C. Author and television host Anthony Bourdain was the predecessor to the executive chef of Brasserie Les Halles, Carlos Llaguno. The restaurant went bankrupt in August 2017.

Overview
The restaurant was named after Les Halles, the historic central wholesale marketplace in Paris, France. The restaurant served simple and classic French dishes such as escargot, foie gras, and steak tartare, which was prepared to order at tableside, and was renowned for its pommes frites. The original Park Avenue location featured a butcher shop that specialized in French cuts of meat.  The Park Avenue location was featured prominently in the book Kitchen Confidential by Anthony Bourdain, who also detailed many of Les Halles' recipes in Anthony Bourdain's Les Halles Cookbook. The Downtown New York branch occupied the site of the former John Street Theatre, "Birthplace of American Theatre." 

The Park Avenue location of Les Halles closed in March 2016. The Washington, D.C. location of Les Halles closed in mid-November 2008 following a fifteen-year run. Owner Philippe Lajaunie cited difficulty obtaining a new lease as the reason. The Miami location is now closed as well. 

In its 2013 user poll, Zagat gave its two New York restaurants each a food rating of 21 out of 30.

In 2018, Les Halles, though closed down, became a memorial to Anthony Bourdain, after his suicide.

In 2022, Les Halles reopened after being renamed La Brasserie, under the ownership of Francis Staub, the founder of Staub cookware. Some iconic dishes by Anthony Bourdain, such as the Steak Frites, are kept on the menu as an homage. 

In April 2023, 'LaBrasserieNYC' is being rebranded as 'Chez Francis'

See also

 List of French restaurants

References

Further reading 

Drinking establishments in Manhattan
Defunct drinking establishments in Manhattan
Restaurants in Manhattan
Defunct restaurants in New York City
French-American culture in New York City
French restaurants in New York City
Financial District, Manhattan
Murray Hill, Manhattan
Steakhouses in New York City
Defunct steakhouses in the United States
Restaurants established in 1990
Restaurants disestablished in 2017
1990 establishments in New York City
2017 disestablishments in New York (state)
Companies that filed for Chapter 11 bankruptcy in 2017
Defunct French restaurants in the United States